James Alfred Aitken (1846–1897) was a Scottish landscape painter.

Life
Aitken studied art with Horatio McCulloch, before moving to Dublin. There he attended the Royal Dublin Society's school, and had Henry MacManus as teacher.

In 1872 Aitken moved to Glasgow. He exhibited at the Royal Academy, Glasgow Institute and Royal Hibernian Academy.

Notes

External links

1846 births
1897 deaths
Scottish watercolourists
Landscape artists
19th-century Scottish painters
Scottish male painters
19th-century Scottish male artists